Annie Wright Schools is a private school in Tacoma, Washington, United States. It is subdivided into Annie Wright Lower School (boys and girls in preschool through grade 5), Annie Wright Middle School (boys and girls in grades 6 to 8), Annie Wright Upper School for Girls (all-girls day and boarding programs for grades 9 to 12), and Annie Wright Upper School for Boys (all-boys day and boarding programs for grades 9 to 12). It was founded in 1884 by Charles Barstow Wright and Bishop John A. Paddock. It has an indoor pool; three gyms; science, design, and technology labs; art and music studios; theatre; outdoor gardens; play areas; athletic fields, and open spaces. The school is an accredited member of National Association of Independent Schools (NAIS), and a member of Northwest Association of Independent Schools (NWAIS), National Coalition of Girls' Schools (NCGS), the International Boys' Schools Coalition (IBSC), and the Educational Records Bureau (ERB). Annie Wright is also a certified International Baccalaureate (IB) World School offering IB curricula throughout the schools.

History
Annie Wright Schools were founded as Annie Wright Seminary by Right Reverend John Adams Paddock and Charles Barstow Wright, who named it for Charles's daughter Annie, to educate the daughters of the pioneers.

In 1884, Annie Wright Seminary opened its doors to 46 students from the Washington Territory, Oregon, British Columbia and Hawaii. At that time, there were ten members of the faculty. The first school catalog outlined the offerings of Annie Wright Seminary: "For board, furnished room, tuition in English branches and Latin, and laundry service, $350 a year."

By the early 1900s, it became apparent that the school building was becoming too small to meet demand. A new location and building were desired to give the school its much-needed space. The property was purchased on North Tacoma Avenue where the cornerstone of a new building was laid on June 9, 1924. Construction of the school was completed in time for the start of the 1924–25 school year and the doors opened to students on September 18, 1924.

Mary McCarthy wrote of her time at Annie Wright Seminary in her memoirs Memories of a Catholic Girlhood and How I Grew.

In 2009, Annie Wright Schools became an International Baccalaureate World School, offering the IB Diploma Programme, with the first diploma recipients in 2011. In 2015, the school was authorized to offer the IB Primary Years Programme in Preschool through Grade 5. As of 2017, Annie Wright Schools qualified for the Middle Years Programme as well.

In January 2017, Annie Wright Schools announced the decision to launch an Upper School for Boys, which opened on August 30, 2017, with 15 ninth-grade boys.

In June 2018, Annie Wright Schools broke ground on two projects: a new academic building for the boys' upper school and a third gym with an underground pool. The academic building opened for the first day of school on August 28, 2019. Tacoma Mayor Victoria Woodards officially opened the building at a community ceremony on Friday, September 6. The new gym and pool opened in December 2019.

After serving as Head of Annie Wright Schools for 10 years, Christian Sullivan ended his tenure on June 30, 2020. Jake Guadnola, who had previously served as the Director for Upper School for Girls and is an Annie Wright alumnus, began his tenure as the current Head of Schools. 

The first class of high school boys graduated in spring 2021. Later that fall, AWS launched its first cohort of Tacoma Scholars, a program that aims to "provide an AWS education to Tacoma students who come from historically disadvantaged communities."

Notable alumni
 Betty Garrett (1919–2011) – actress
 Mary McCarthy (1912–1989) – author
 Eloise Mumford – actress

See also
 Washington College (Tacoma)

References

External links
Annie Wright Schools website

Private elementary schools in Washington (state)
Private middle schools in Washington (state)
Private high schools in Washington (state)
High schools in Pierce County, Washington
Educational institutions established in 1884
Schools in Tacoma, Washington
Schools in Pierce County, Washington
1884 establishments in Washington Territory
Girls' schools in Washington (state)
Boys' schools in the United States